Chamarajpet is a locality in the central part of the city of Bangalore. It is bordered by Basavanagudi, Banashankari, Chickpet and Majestic.

Chamarajpet is one of the oldest areas in Bangalore, 2.9 km. from Bangalore City Railway Station and BMTC and 37.1 km. to Kempegowda International airport. The main commercial street of Chamrajpete is the Bazar Street, the continuation of which is Bull Temple Road.

Chamarajpet was founded in 1892 and the 125th anniversary was celebrated with a 3-day festival in the year 2017.

Chamarajpet houses many historical structures such as Kote Sri Prasanna Venkateshwara Swamy Temple, Fort High School, Tipu Sultan Summer Palace and Minto Hospital.

Raghavendra Colony, situated in the area, has a historical connection to the Maharaja of Mysore who visited here to meet Bengaluru's first-ever surgeon, Dr. B. D. Raghavendra Rao. Sri Sripadaraja Matha of Mulbagal is in Raghavendra Colony.

The locality got the name "Chamarajpet" because of the visit by Maharaja Chamarajendra Wodeyar. It was first named Chamarajendra Pete, which was later shortened to Chamrajpete.

The area becomes a music hub every year during the months of April and May, i.e., in the Rama Navami season. Sree Ramaseva Mandali RCT, one of the premier cultural organizations of the country, organizes an annual global music festival on the grounds of Fort High School, hosting the who's who of Indian Classical Music.

The area is also home to many manufacturers of agarbathis (incense sticks) and related items. The area is composed of five main roads and nine cross roads. A temple is located on every main road. The layout was referred to as the Chess Box Colony, given that when they were originally built, they all had square dimensions of 108 feet by 108 feet, that made it look like a chess board.

The nearest metro stations are the Krishna Rajendra Market metro station and the City Railway Station metro station. The locality has improved to a great extent and has a presence of over 10 to 15 educational institutions. Adarsh College is one of the prominent educational institutions, that attracts a large part of crowd from various cities across the country. Chamrajpete Houses some popular hospitals and medical centers with reputation.

This area is known for its peace, greenery and historical attractions.

The headquarters of the Kannada Sahitya Parishath is also located here.

References

Neighbourhoods in Bangalore